Nandana Mendis was the Chief Minister of Western Province of Sri Lanka.

References

Sri Lankan Buddhists
Chief Ministers of Western Province, Sri Lanka
Members of the Western Provincial Council
Sri Lanka Freedom Party politicians
United People's Freedom Alliance politicians
Living people
Year of birth missing (living people)
Sinhalese politicians